Christmas Story, A Christmas Story, or The Christmas Story may refer to:

 Nativity of Jesus in Christianity

Film
 A Christmas Story, a 1983 comedy film based on the anecdotes of Jean Shepherd
 A Christmas Story: The Musical, a 2012 musical version of the 1983 film A Christmas Story
 A Christmas Story Live!, a 2017 live musical television program inspired by the 1983 film A Christmas Story
 A Christmas Story Christmas, a 2022 sequel to the 1983 film
 Christmas Story (film), (Joulutarina), a 2007 Finnish Christmas drama film

Television
 The Homecoming: A Christmas Story, a 1971 television movie that acted as the pilot for the series The Waltons
 A Christmas Story (1972 TV special), a 1972 animated short produced by Hanna-Barbera
 "A Christmas Story" (Lassie)
 "The Christmas Story" (The Andy Griffith Show)
 "The Christmas Story" (Dragnet)

Music
 Christmas Story (Schütz), 1660 composition 
 A Christmas Story - An Axe, An Apple and a Buckskin Jacket, a 1957 album by Bing Crosby
 A Christmas Story (Point of Grace album), a 1999 album by Point of Grace
 A Christmas Story, 45-minute pop cantata by Anita Kerr and album 1971

See also 

 A Christmas Carol (disambiguation)
 Christmas Tale (disambiguation)